Timofiej Fłorinski (1854–1918) was a Russian historian, specializing in the Medieval history of South Slavs. He was a member of the Kiev Club of Russian Nationalists and authored a number of publications against Ukrainian nationalist movement. In 1918, he was executed by the Bolsheviks.

Fłorinski was murdered by Rosa Schwartz, a member of the Communist Revolutionary Tribunal for examination. Schwartz, who was inebriated during the interrogation, became annoyed with a response by Fłorinski and promptly drew a pistol and fired on him, killing him instantly.

References

1854 births
1919 deaths
20th-century Russian historians
Corresponding members of the Saint Petersburg Academy of Sciences
19th-century historians from the Russian Empire